Pleurotus albidus is a species of edible fungus in the family Pleurotaceae. Found in Caribbean, Central America and South America, it was described as new to science by Miles Joseph Berkeley, and given its current name by David Norman Pegler in 1983. It grows on trees such as Salix humboldtiana, other willows, Populus and Araucaria angustifolia, and can be cutivated by humans. Phylogenetic research has shown that while it belongs to P. ostreatus clade, it forms its own intersterility group.

See also
List of Pleurotus species

References

External links

Fungi described in 1983
Fungi of South America
Pleurotaceae